Marie-Pierre Casey is a French actress and author, born January 24, 1937 in Le Creusot (Saône-et-Loire).

Student of René Simon, she began her career in the cabarets of the left bank. Mainly known for her numerous roles in theater, film and television, she participates in radio dramas since the 2000s for Radio France.

In 1980, she was awarded the Minerve prize, the Oscar for advertising received for the Pliz ad.

Author of numerous one-woman shows, she presented her first sketch at the Olympia (1984), Painter on oneself at the Théâtre du Tourtour (1987-1988) and Du coq à l'âme at the Théâtre Déjazet (1991).

From the 1970s onwards, she played some remarkable supporting roles in films, before achieving fame by becoming one of the key figures in television in the 1980s.

Star actress of French television dramas, she played Madame Moulinard in Marc et Sophie (1987-1992), Madame Leblanc in the series Cluedo (1994-1995), Lucienne Le Kervelec in En famille (since 2018) and Claude in La Flamme (2020).

In 1995, she played the title role in the series Les Gromelot et les Dupinson, launched by France 2 to succeed Maguy. The same year she co-presented with Daniel Schick, Maman va adorer, on Saturday nights in prime time on TF1.

In 2023, she is in the film Les Petites Victoires by Mélanie Auffret.

Early life and education 

Marie-Pierre Casey was born on January 24, 1937 in Le Creusot, Saône-et-Loire. At the age of nine, she went to boarding school in Charolais with her sister and discovered her passion for the theater where she put on the clothes of Prof - a leader of the seven dwarfs in the Snow White tale by the Grimm brothers - for the end-of-year party organized by the nuns.

She grew up in Le Creusot with her grandparents, where she developed a taste for theatrical performance when she arrived at school with her grandfather's driver.

She studied at the Conservatory of Lyon and at the Cours Simon in Paris, before launching herself in cabarets on the Left Bank.

Career 

In the early 1950s, Marie-Pierre Casey gets a small role, a silhouette of a sister at the end of the film Forbidden Games by Rene Clement (1952).

She began in the cabarets of the Left Bank, where she was noticed in a sketch with a bow on his head and daisy in hand.

In the 1960s, she played several plays by Molière and many musicals at the Porte-Saint-Martin theater. Marie-Pierre Casey went on stage to play in several plays by Jean-Michel Ribes at the Théâtre de la Ville and the Gaîté-Montparnasse during the 1970s.

In 1960, she played a nurse in Jean Bastia's Certains l'aiment froide and, in 1967, the cashier of the Royal Garden in Jacques Tati's Playtime.

In 1970, on the big screen, she played notable supporting roles in Les Choses de la vie by Claude Sautet and in La Peau de Torpedo by Jean Delannoy. She also plays the role of director of the Pigier courses in Le Cinéma de papa by Claude Berri.

In 1973, she starts a scene where she congratulates the commissioner, played by Paul Crauchet, in The Dominici Affair by Claude Bernard-Aubert. 

In 1980, on television, the whole of France discovers Marie-Pierre Casey in a commercial for the Pliz dusting product from the Johnson company. Her line "And it's so much the better because I won't do that every day..." was a big hit with viewers. She receives the Minerve award for best actress in a television commercial. During this ceremony, Jean Becker noticed her and offered her a role as Michel Galabru's nurse in his film L'Été meurtrier (1983) alongside Isabelle Adjani and Alain Souchon. The commercial won multiple awards, including a silver lion at the Cannes International Advertising Film Festival. 

Around 1981, Stéphane Collaro invites her for his radio show on Europe 1, as well as those of the television Co-Co Boy and Cocoricocoboy, because she "makes him laugh" and engages him.

In 1983, she appeared in the TV movie Thérèse Humbert by Marcel Bluwal, on Antenne 2. She plays the guardian of the title character, played by Simone Signoret.

At the end of 1984, she performed a number in the first part of Michel Leeb's show at the Olympia.

In 1985, she left Cocoricocoboy for good when the Coco-girls arrived: "(...) she regularly played the maids or the janitors, did not shine by her sex appeal but knew how to charm the members of the troupe by her humor (...). With the arrival of the Coco-girls, the criteria of seduction focused more on the cleavage and the roundness of the buttocks, and Marie-Pierre Casey, considering her blouses with flowery print, felt a vague jealousy. She could not stand it and left us," says Jean Roucas in his book Le Bouffon (1993).

In 1987, she played Madame Moulinard in the series Marc et Sophie, broadcast for five seasons until 1992, on TF1.

In the early 1990s, she is a member of the big heads. In 1991, she played her second one-woman show at the Théâtre Déjazet for several months. In 1993, she returned to the stage of the Théâtre Michel with Sexe et Jalousie by Marc Camoletti.

In 1994, she returned to television with the series Cluedo, broadcast on France 3, where she played Madame Leblanc alongside Andréa Ferréol and Bernard Ménez for a year.

In 1995, she is one of the main roles in the weekly series Les Gromelot et les Dupinson. Launched by France 2 to succeed the very popular Maguy which had just ended. The same year, she co-presents, with Daniel Schick, the program Maman va adorer, on Saturdays, in the first part of the evening, on TF1.

In 1997, she went to the Théâtre d'Edgar for a third one-woman show, Marie-Jeanne a disparu.

n 2004, Marie-Pierre Casey played Ma Cassidy in the comedy Les Dalton by Philippe Haïm, with Marthe Villalonga as Ma Dalton, Ginette Garcin as Ma James and Sylvie Joly as Ma Billy.

During the 2000s, she plays in several dramas for Radio France, we can cite the adaptation of Les Inconnus dans la maison by Georges Simenon in 2003 or the adaptation of the comic Agrippine by Claire Bretécher in 2012.

At the Théâtre des Variétés, she plays Émilie in La Dame de chez Maxim's , she also plays alone on stage in On descend tous des limaces at the Théo Théâtre.

Since June 2018, she plays Aunt Lucienne in the popular series En famille broadcast on M6: "I love it! In addition, I bitch all the time in life, so the transfer was done directly! It was not at all a role of composition! Besides, all the characters I've played so far are always bitching. It amuses me a lot".

In March 2020, she played in the radio adaptation of Jean Giono's Un roi sans divertissement on France Culture14 broadcast on the occasion of the fiftieth anniversary of the writer's death15. In October 2020, she was part of the cast of the series La Flamme, on Canal+, alongside Jonathan Cohen, Florence Foresti and Laure Calamy, playing the character of Claude, an "atypical 3x28 year old pretender".

In 2022, she made her return to cinema with the film Maison de retraite by Thomas Gilou. In 2023, she played the role of Jeannine in Les Petites Victoires by Mélanie Auffret and Michaël Souhaité.

Filmography

Films

Discography 

 1984: Je suis un sex symbol
 1984: Sexy Varoum
 1992: God Save The Cheese

References 

20th-century French actresses
1937 births
Living people
People from Le Creusot